Gynacantha mocsaryi is a species of dragonfly in the family Aeshnidae, 
known as the paddle-tipped duskhawker. 
It is found in northern Queensland, Australia,
the Maluku Islands and New Guinea.

Gynacantha mocsaryi is a large, dark coloured dragonfly with a strongly constricted waist in its abdomen at segment 3. Adult males have a blue colouring. It is a crepuscular insect and flies at dawn and dusk.

Gallery

See also
 List of Odonata species of Australia

References

Aeshnidae
Odonata of Australia
Insects of New Guinea
Taxa named by Friedrich Förster
Insects described in 1898